Stratton Oakmont, Inc. v. Prodigy Services Co., 23 Media L. Rep. 1794 (N.Y. Sup. Ct. 1995), is a 1995 U.S. New York Supreme Court decision holding that online service providers could be held liable for the speech of their users. The ruling caused controversy among early supporters of the Internet, including some lawmakers, leading to the passage of Section 230 of the Communications Decency Act in 1996.

Facts
Prodigy, an early online content hosting site, hosted a bulletin board called Money Talk on which anonymous persons could post messages about finance and investing. In October 1994, an unidentified user on Money Talk created a post claiming that Stratton Oakmont, a securities investment banking firm based in Long Island, New York, and its president Danny Porush, had committed criminal and fraudulent acts in connection with a stock IPO. Stratton Oakmont sued Prodigy as well as the unidentified poster for defamation.

Court ruling

Stratton Oakmont argued that Prodigy should be considered a publisher of the defamatory material, and was therefore liable for the postings under the common law definition of defamation. Prodigy requested a dismissal of the complaint, on the grounds that it could not be held liable for the content of postings created by its third-party users. This argument cited the 1991 precedent Cubby, Inc. v. CompuServe Inc., which had found CompuServe, an online service provider, not liable as a publisher for user-generated content.

The Stratton court held that Prodigy was liable as the publisher of the content created by its users because it exercised editorial control over the messages on its bulletin boards in three ways: 1) by posting Content Guidelines for users; 2) by enforcing those guidelines with "Board Leaders"; and 3) by utilizing screening software designed to remove offensive language. The court's general argument for holding Prodigy liable, distinguishing from the CompuServe case, was that "Prodigy's conscious choice, to gain the benefits of editorial control, has opened it up to a greater liability than CompuServe and other computer networks that make no such choice."

Impact
This case conflicted with the 1991 federal district court decision in Cubby, Inc. v. CompuServe Inc., which had suggested that courts would not consider online service providers to be publishers. In that case, the court held that CompuServe should be considered to be more like a digital library than a publisher. The important difference between CompuServe and Prodigy for the Stratton court was that Prodigy engaged in content screening and therefore exercised editorial control. 

Some federal legislators noticed the contradiction in the two rulings, while Internet enthusiasts found that expecting service providers to accept liability for the speech of third-party users was both untenable and likely to stifle the development of the Internet. Senator Ron Wyden (D. Or.) proposed legislation that would resolve the contradictory precedents on service provider liability while enabling websites and platforms to host speech without needing to worry about legal liability. The proposal became Section 230 of the Communications Decency Act in 1996. While the rest of the Communications Decency Act was overturned by the Supreme Court as an unconstitutional speech restriction, Section 230 was severed from the rest of the statute and is still in effect, because it was intended to enable speech rather than restrict it. Section 230 also served to overturn the New York Supreme Court ruling in the Stratton case, as the legislation clarified that Internet service providers are not to be considered "publishers" of that content and instead merely provide a platform for third-party speakers.

Related cases

Notes

References

External links
 Blogger's Legal Guide: Section 230 Protections

New York (state) state case law
United States Internet case law
United States Free Speech Clause case law
1995 in United States case law
1995 in New York (state)
AT&T litigation